Vacationland is an independent, gay-themed, coming-of-age film directed by Todd Verow and starring Brad Hallowell as Joe and Gregory J. Lucas as Andrew, two high school youth who have a crush on each other, but have difficulties to reconcile with their sexuality in a small town. Vacationland is one of the official slogans for the state of Maine, where the events of the film are taking place.

Synopsis
The film, set in Bangor, Maine, is based on some of Verow's experiences in Maine. Joe (Brad Hallowell), 18-year-old high school senior, lives with his single mother and his older sister Teresa (Hilary Mann), who works in a convenience store. They live in a notorious estate called the Capehart Projects. Joe dreams of moving away from town to attend an arts school. Joe is attracted to men and has a crush on his friend Andrew (Gregory J. Lucas), a football player in his high school. Upon the encouragement of  Joe's friend Kris (Mindy Hofman) and Andrew's friend Mandy (Jennifer Stackpole), they explore their mutual attraction for each other and fall further in love. Kris and Mandy also experiment sex together. During one of his early sexual encounters with Andrew, Joe admits to Andrew having been gang-raped by three older men after witnessing his older friend Tim's being raped by the same men at the warehouse he works.

Joe is determined to leave town to pursue arts and design studies at a college in Rhode Island, particularly after his sister leaves to Los Angeles having robbed the convenience store she has been working in for years to arrange for her airline ticket. Joe has a fling with the French language teacher in a bathroom and then blackmails him to get good grades and to get the crucial recommendation he needs as his passport to arts school. Joe also befriends an elderly disabled artist named Victor (Charles Ard) who hires him as a model and a house boy. Joe actually moves in with Victor in his loft above the local opera house. For securing his services and occasional sexual favors, Victor provides Joe with recommendation and help to be accepted to an arts school, and decides to commit suicide with an overdose of drugs, leaving all his money and possessions to Joe to fulfill his dreams.

Andrew sinks into more trouble, theft and heavy drinking. He tries to reconcile with his own sexuality and what he wants to do with the rest of his life and how can he keep Joe who is determined to go away. During their escapades to nearby Styxx gay venue, Joe happens to recognize his childhood friend Tim (Michael John Dion), now a gay man, but Tim shoves him off. Joe also recognizes one of his tormenters at the club and decides to get even with the help of Andrew. The film ends with Joe and Andrew contemplating on what they need to do with their lives.

Cast
 Brad Hallowell as Joe
 Gregory J. Lucas as Andrew
 Hilary Mann as Theresa
 Jennifer Stackpole as Mandy
 Mindy Hofman as Kris
 Charles Ard as Victor
 Michael John Dion as Tim 
 Nathan Johnson as French teacher Mr. LaBlanc
 Theodore Bouloukos as Richard
 Gregg Anderson as Sandi
 Jono Mainelli as John
 Former Maine State Representative Chris Greeley as a police officer
 Todd Verow as Man in bar

External links
 
 
 Teddy Awards Trailer and Clip

2006 films
American LGBT-related films
Films set in Maine
Films shot in Maine
LGBT-related coming-of-age films
2006 LGBT-related films
2000s English-language films
2000s American films